Mastering the Art of Solution-Focused Counseling is a book by mental health counselor Jeffrey Guterman that describes the theory and practice of "solution-focused counseling". The first edition of the book was published in 2006 by the American Counseling Association. An updated and expanded second edition of the book was published by the American Counseling Association in 2013.

Reception
The Journal of Marital and Family Therapy reviewed Guterman's counseling model, stating that he "clearly demonstrates and stresses the adaptability of this model as well as its usefulness for the client and therapist."

References

External links
American Counseling Association (Publisher)
Author's Web site
 (first edition),   (second edition)

Mastering the Art of Solution-Focused Counseling